London Buses route 94 is a Transport for London contracted bus route in London, England. Running between Acton Green and Piccadilly Circus, it is operated by London United.

History

Route 94 commenced operating on 22 September 1990 to replace the withdrawn section of route 88 between Acton Green and Oxford Circus, it then ran parallel to route 88 to Trafalgar Square (Sundays only). On 13 July 1991 it was diverted to East Acton DuCane Road and the service level increased following the truncation of route 12 west of Shepherd's Bush. At the same time it was extended at all times to Trafalgar Square.

Route 94 gained a night service in the form of N94 in July 1999. It was the first night bus and was introduced by the General.

On 24 January 2004, route 94 was converted to one man operation with the AEC Routemasters replaced by Alexander ALX400 bodied Dennis Trident 2s. Twenty Alexander Dennis Enviro400Hs entered service on the route in late 2010.

In February 2020, 29 ADL Enviro400EVs entered service on route 94.

Cultural significance
Route 94 was featured on the BBC Radio 4 program Today in December 2003 as part of a story by guest editor Gillian Reynolds on the withdrawal of the Routemaster. It also appeared on the front of the annual Britain's Buses calendar for the same year.

Current route
Route 94 operates via these primary locations:
Acton Green Duke of Sussex
The Avenue for Turnham Green station 
Goldhawk Road station 
Shepherd's Bush stations   
Holland Park station 
Notting Hill Gate station 
Queensway station 
Lancaster Terrace for Lancaster Gate station 
Marble Arch station 
Bond Street station 
Oxford Circus station 
Regent Street
Piccadilly Circus station 
Piccadilly Circus Charles II Street

References

External links

Timetable

Bus routes in London
Transport in the London Borough of Ealing
Transport in the London Borough of Hammersmith and Fulham
Transport in the Royal Borough of Kensington and Chelsea
Transport in the City of Westminster